Makeup sex is an informal term for sexual intercourse which may be experienced after conflict in an intimate personal relationship. These conflicts may range from minor arguments to relationship breakups. Sex under these circumstances may be more gratifying and invested with additional emotional significance. It is sometimes conceived as a physical expression of reconciliation and rediscovery of one's partner following the cathartic experience of a fight and may resolve underlying conflicts.

Makeup sex has been attributed to increased sexual desires stemming from romantic conflict. After conflict during a relationship, arousal transfer may occur which shifts anger into arousal. Experts disagree on the outlook of makeup sex, some believe makeup sex is unhealthy as it rewards "fighting, drama, and generally bad behavior". Sexologist and television personality Jessica O’Reilly describes makeup sex as positive, settling conflicts which can only be resolved through sex. Makeup sex may be more intense, as it may assist in releasing underlying emotions.

Breakup sex
While makeup sex is often seen as a form of reconciliation, breakup sex has been described as "more like one last 'hurrah' before you part ways". Both may have positive and negative consequences. Breakup sex "can confuse boundaries and postpone the inevitable separation".

References

Human sexuality